78431 Kemble, provisional designation , is a background asteroid from the inner regions of the asteroid belt, approximately  in diameter. It was named after Father Lucian Kemble. The asteroid was discovered on 16 August 2002, by astronomer Andrew Lowe on images taken at the Palomar Observatory, California, United States.

Naming 

This minor planet was named in honor of Father Lucian Kemble (1922–1999), who was a Franciscan friar and astronomer. His recorded main interest in astronomy was searching out deep sky objects and he was also known for his interest in asterisms such as Kemble's Cascade. The official  was published by the Minor Planet Center on 18 September 2005 .

Orbit and classification 

Kemble is a non-family asteroid of the main belt's background population. It orbits the Sun in the inner asteroid belt at a distance of 2.1–2.8 AU once every 3 years and 10 months (1,395 days; semi-major axis of 2.44 AU). Its orbit has an eccentricity of 0.15 and an inclination of 3° with respect to the ecliptic. A precovery obtained at the Steward Observatory (Kitt Peak) in 1991, extends the body's observation arc by 11 years prior to its official discovery observation.

Physical characteristics 

A generic diameter of 1 to 3 kilometers can be derived for Kemble based on its absolute magnitude of 16.6 and with an assumed albedo of 0.20, which is typical for the abundant silicaceous asteroids in the inner main-belt. As of 2019, Kembles effective size, its composition and albedo, as well as its rotation period and shape remain unknown.

References

External links 
 Asteroid Lightcurve Database (LCDB), query form (info )
 Dictionary of Minor Planet Names, Google books
 Discovery Circumstances: Numbered Minor Planets (75001)-(80000) – Minor Planet Center
 
 

078431
Discoveries by Andrew Lowe
Named minor planets
20020816